The Masonic Temple is a historic Masonic temple located at Warrensburg, Johnson County, Missouri. It was built in 1893–1894, and is a rectangular three-story, Italianate style red brick building with extensive sandstone trim.  The building measures approximately 48 feet by 92 feet. 

It was for many years the meeting hall of Corinthian Lodge # 265 (a local Masonic Lodge), but the lodge has subsequently moved to other premises.

It was listed on the National Register of Historic Places in 1998.

Notes

References

Former Masonic buildings in Missouri
Clubhouses on the National Register of Historic Places in Missouri
Italianate architecture in Missouri
Buildings and structures completed in 1894
Buildings and structures in Johnson County, Missouri
National Register of Historic Places in Johnson County, Missouri